The UND Fighting Hawks women's hockey team represented the University of North Dakota in WCHA women's ice hockey during the 2016-17 NCAA Division I women's ice hockey season. On March 29, 2017, The University of North Dakota announced that the women's ice hockey was being terminated due to budget cuts.

Offseason

July 25: Halli Krzyzaniak and Ryleigh Houston were chosen to participate in the Team Canada Development Camp in Calgary, Alberta.

Recruiting

2015–16 Fighting Hawks

Schedule

|-
!colspan=12 style="background:#009e60; color:#fff;"| Regular Season

|-
!colspan=12 style="background:#009e60; color:#fff;"| WCHA Tournament

Awards and honors

Halli Krzyzaniak, Defense, All-WCHA Second Team 

Ryleigh Houston, Forward, All-WCHA Rookie Team

References

North Dakota
North Dakota Fighting Hawks women's ice hockey seasons
Fight
Fight